The Clare county hurling team represents Clare in hurling and is governed by Clare GAA, the county board of the Gaelic Athletic Association. The team competes in the three major annual inter-county competitions - the All-Ireland Senior Hurling Championship, the Munster Senior Hurling Championship and the National Hurling League.

Clare's home ground is Cusack Park, Ennis. The team's manager is Brian Lohan from Wolfe Tones, Shannon.

The team last won the Munster Senior Championship in 1998, the All-Ireland Senior Championship in 2013 and the National League in 2016.

History

Clare has won the Munster Senior Hurling Championship (SHC) on six occasions and the All-Ireland Senior Hurling Championship (SHC) on four occasions.

Early years (1889–1932)
In 1889, Clare won its first Munster SHC title after receiving a walkover from Kerry in the final. Clare contested the 1889 All-Ireland Senior Hurling Championship Final, but lost to Dublin by a scoreline of 5–01 to 1–06.

Clare won a second Munster SHC title in 1914, deafeting Cork by a scoreline of 3–02 to 3–01. Clare then defeated Galway in the All-Ireland semi-final by 6–06 to 0–00 to reach the 1914 All-Ireland Senior Hurling Championship Final. In that game Clare defeated Laois by a scoreline of 2–04 to 1–02, with Amby Power becoming the first man to captain Clare to an All-Ireland hurling title.

Clare won another Munster SHC title in 1932, defeating Cork on a scoreline of 5–02 to 4–01. The team contested the 1932 All-Ireland Senior Hurling Championship Final, but lost to Kilkenny by a scoreline of 3–03 to 2–03.

Famine years (1933–1994)

Ger Loughnane era (1995–2000)
After losing Munster SHC finals in 1993 and 1994, Len Gaynor was replaced as manager by Ger Loughnane, from Feakle. Clare made a return to the Munster SHC final in 1995 after a 2–13 to 3–09 victory over Cork in the semi-final. In the closing minutes of that game, Cork were leading by two points, at which point Clare earned a sideline, which was taken by Fergie Tuohy. It travelled to the edge of the square, where Ollie Baker doubled on the sliotar, scoring a goal, to send Clare through to the decider. In the final, Clare faced Limerick. Clare dominated the game and easily won, by a scoreline of 1–17 to 0–11. This was Clare's first Munster SHC title in 63 years. In the All-Ireland SHC semi-final, Clare played Galway. 2–01 from Ger 'Sparrow' O'Loughlin and 0–07 from Jamesie O'Connor helped  Clare through to the final by a scoreline of 3–12 to 1–13. Offaly, the reigning All-Ireland SHC champions, awaited Clare in that game. In the second half, an Anthony Daly free rebounded off the post and fell to Eamonn Taaffe at the edge of the square; Taaffe sent the ball into the back of the Offaly net. Clare won by a scoreline of 1–13 to 2–08 to secure a first All-Ireland SHC in 81 years.

In 1996, Limerick defeated Clare in the opening round of the Munster SHC by a scoreline of 1–13 to 0–15. This ended Clare's participation in that year's competition.

In 1997, Clare defeated Kerry and Cork to qualify for a Munster SHC final against Tipperary. That game was held in Páirc Uí Chaoimh, Cork and Clare won a close match by a scoreline of 1–18 to 0–18. Clare then defeated Kilkenny by a scoreline of 1–17 to 1–13 in the All-Ireland SHC semi-final. In the subsequent All-Ireland SHC final, Clare faced Tipperary, an opponent that had advanced through "the back door" to reach the final. A late Tipperary goal gave that team the lead but, entering the closing stages, the teams were tied at 2–13 to 0–19. Jamesie O'Connor then scored a point that was enough to win Clare the All-Ireland SHC title. He finished the game with 0–07 and later won the All Stars Hurler of the Year award.

In 1998, Clare retained the Munster SHC title. The team defeated Cork by a scoreline of 0–21 to 0–13 to qualify for the final, where they faced Waterford. A late goal from a Paul Flynn free tied the game at 1–16 to 3–10 and sent it to a replay. Clare won the replay by a scoreline of 2–16 to 0–10. Clare faced Offaly in the 1998 All-Ireland SHC semi-final. That game ended in a draw, 1–13 apiece. In the replay Clare were leading in the closing stages by a scoreline of 2–10 to 1–16; however the referee accidentally blew the match up early. Disarray engulfed Croke Park as disgruntled Offaly supporters began a sit-down protest on the pitch. As the full 70 minutes had not been completed, the semi-final had to be replayed. On this occasion, Offaly won by a scoreline of 0–16 to 0–13.

Clare defeated Tipperary to qualify for the 1999 Munster SHC final, setting up the chance for Clare to win a third successive Munster SHC title. However, Cork won by a scoreline of 1–15 to 0–14. In the All-Ireland SHC quarter-final, Clare defeated Galway (after a replay) by a scoreline of 3–18 to 2–14. In the All-Ireland SHC semi-final, Kilkenny defeated Clare by a scoreline of 2–14 to 1–13.

Tipperary defeated Clare in the 2000 Munster SHC semi-final by a scoreline of 2–19 to 1–14. This was Ger Loughnane's last match as Clare manager.

Post-Loughnane years (2001–2011)

Davy Fitzgerald era (2012–2016)
In 2012, Davy Fitzgerald began his tenure as Clare manager. At that time Clare had not won a championship match since 2008 and the team was also in the second tier of the National Hurling League. Clare won Division 1B of the league to gain promotion for the following year. In the Munster SHC, Clare lost to Waterford by a scoreline of 2–17 to 1–18. Clare then faced Dublin in a 2012 All-Ireland Senior Hurling Championship qualifier. In what was Tony Kelly's first senior game for the county, he scored 1–02 to help Clare win by a scoreline of 1–16 to 0–16. In the next round Limerick defeated Clare by a scoreline of 3-18 to 1-20.

In the 2013 season, Clare defeated Waterford in the Munster SHC quarter-final by a scoreline of 2–20 to 1–15, outscoring them by 2–12 to 0–06 in the second half. This was the first time Clare had won a Munster SHC game since 2008. In the Munster SHC semi-final, Cork defeated Clare by a scoreline of 0–23 to 0–15. Clare then defeated Laois and Wexford in the 2013 All-Ireland SHC qualifiers. Thus Clare advanced to an All-Ireland SHC quarter-final against Galway, winning that game by a scoreline of by 1-23 to 2-14. Munster SHC winner Limerick awaited Clare in the All-Ireland SHC semi-final. An early Darach Honan goal helped Clare win by a scoreline of 1–22 to 0–18 and qualify for a first All-Ireland SHC final since 2002. The 2013 All-Ireland Senior Hurling Championship Final was held on 8 September and Clare led at half-time. In the second half Cork scored three goals to get back into the game. With the sides level, Patrick Horgan scored to put Cork into the lead. Moments later, in injury-time, Domhnall O'Donovan pointed to send the game to a replay, the full-time score being 3–16 to 0–25. On 28 September 2013, Clare won the replay by a scoreline of 5–16 to 3–16. Shane O'Donnell scored 3–03 of Clare's total in that game. A Conor McGrath goal in the 61st minute was quickly followed by three points to put Clare 4–16 to 2–16 ahead. A late Stephen Moylan goal was cancelled out by a Darach Honan goal and Clare won by a scoreline of 5–16 to 3–16. Clare's centre-forward, Tony Kelly, was awarded both the All Stars Young Hurler of the Year and All Stars Hurler of the Year awards.

Clare lost the 2014 Munster SHC semi-final to Cork by a scoreline of 2–23 to 2–18. In round 1 of the 2014 All-Irelnd SHC qualifiers, 14-man Clare drew 2–25 apiece with Wexford. In the replay at Wexford Park, despite being down to 13 men, Clare forced the game to extra-time before losing by a scoreline of 2–25 to 2–22. Clare hurling was dealt a further blow at the end of 2014 when the Cratloe trio of Podge Collins, Sean Collins, and Cathal McInerney announced they would focus on football the following year.

2015 began tumultuously, with two players (Davy O'Halloran and Nicky O'Connell), oping to leave the panel over their belief that they had been subjected to unfair disciplinary action. On the field of play, Clare lost four of its five league group stage matches before being relegated to Division 1B, after losing a play-off to Kilkenny by a scoreline of 1–18 to 1–17. Clare also lost its Munster SHC first round game to Limerick, by a scoreline of 1–19 to 2–15. A comprehensive 3–26 to 0–15 win over Offaly sent Clare through to round 2 of the 2015 All-Ireland SHC qualifiers, where Cork won by a scoreline of 0–20 to 0–17.

Clare won the 2016 National Hurling League in May that year, a first since 1978 after a 1–23 to 2–19 win against Waterford in a replay.

Post-Fitzgerald years (2016–present)

Support
There exists a supporters' club called Club Clare, which was established in 2017.

Club Clare is not linked to a supporters' club that existed during Davy Fitzgerald's time as manager between 2012 and 2016. Fitzgerald established that club and was involved in its running. Clare GAA told the Sunday Independent in 2021 that it did not have the accounts of that club and that the club (and similar supporters' clubs) had "nothing to do with" the county board. This contradicted Fitzgerald, who wrote in his 2018 book At All Costs: "Every single cent raised was accounted for, every detail presented to the audit committee. And that's what makes my blood boil when, even to this day, some smart-asses toss out that lazy question, 'Where did all the money go?' about the Supporters' Club in Clare. Open your eyes. Ask the audit committee. Ask the county board". During the 2020 championship meeting between Clare and Wexford (then being managed by Fitzgerald), Fitzgerald had an exchange with a member of the Clare backroom team. Fitzgerald said afterwards: "I had to endure criticism from an unnamed individual who was seated in the stand", describing it as abuse and asking Clare's county board to investigate. The man later identified himself as kitman Niall Romer, who said: "I asked the question, where was the money that was raised in America? Where was the money from the Supporters' Club? And it got a reaction. There was no abuse, I asked a question, and when I got a reaction I kept asking the question... He didn't know where it was coming from at first. After that he realised and shut up". Romer said he had decided to ask the question himself (provoked, he said, by a delay in the release of the Wexford team sheet ahead of the game) and that it had not been a tactic of manager Brian Lohan.

Current panel

Current management team
Manager: Brian Lohan
Selectors: Ken Ralph, James Moran
Coaches: Seán Treacy, Shane Hassett

Managerial history

Competitive record
All-Ireland SHC final record

Players

Notable players

Jamesie O'Connor

Records

Most appearances

Top scorers

All Stars
Since the All-Stars began in 1971, 32 Clare players have amassed a total of 57 All-Star Awards.

Since the foundation of the Under-21 All-Star Awards in 2013, 14 Clare players have amassed 17 awards.

Munster Under-21 Hurler of the Year
 2009 - Darach Honan
 2012 - Tony Kelly
 2013 - Colm Galvin
 2014 - Séadna Morey

Munster Minor Hurler of the Year
 2010 - Niall Arthur
 2011 - Tony Kelly

Honours

National
All-Ireland Senior Hurling Championship
 Winners (4): 1914, 1995, 1997, 2013
 Runners-up (3): 1889, 1932, 2002
National Hurling League
 Winners (4): 1945–46, 1976–77, 1977–78, 2016
 Runners-up (7): 1975–76, 1984–85, 1986–87, 1994–95, 2001, 2005, 2020
National Hurling League Division 2
 Winners (7): 1971, 1981, 1985, 1990, 1994, 2012, 2016
All-Ireland Intermediate Hurling Championship
 Winners (1): 2011
 Runners-up (1): 2016
All-Ireland Junior Hurling Championship
 Winners (2): 1914, 1993
 Runners-up (2): 1949, 1995
All-Ireland Under-21 Hurling Championship
 Winners (4): 2009, 2012, 2013, 2014
All-Ireland Minor Hurling Championship
 Winners (4): 1997
 Runners-up (2): 1989, 2010

Provincial
Munster Senior Hurling Championship
 Winners (6): 1889, 1914, 1932, 1995, 1997, 1998
 Runners-up (23): 1899, 1901, 1915, 1918, 1927, 1928, 1930, 1938, 1955, 1967, 1972, 1974, 1977, 1978, 1981, 1986, 1993, 1994, 1999, 2008, 2017, 2018, 2022
Waterford Crystal Cup
 Winners (2): 2009, 2013
 Runners-up (2): 2012, 2014
Munster Senior Hurling League
 Winners (2): 2016, 2019
 Runners-up (1): 2018
Munster Intermediate Hurling Championship
 Winners (2): 2011, 2016
 Runners-up (3): 1963, 2001, 2012
Munster Junior Hurling Championship
 Winners (4): 1914, 1949, 1993, 1995
Munster Under-21 Hurling Championship
 Winners (4): 2009, 2012, 2013, 2014
 Runners-up (14): 1972, 1974, 1976, 1983, 1985, 1986, 1992, 1994, 1995, 1996, 1999, 2008, 2010, 2015 
Munster Minor Hurling Championship
 Winners (4): 1981, 1989, 2010, 2011
 Runners-up (16): 1932, 1939, 1940, 1945, 1949, 1950, 1952, 1971, 1990, 1997, 1998 1999, 2012, 2017, 2019, 2022

Other
Players Champions Cup
 Winners (1): 2017
RTÉ Sports Team of the Year Award
 Winners (1): 2013

Under-21 team
At the Under-21 grade, Clare have won 4 Munster titles and 4 All-Irelands.

Under-21 Breakthrough (2009)
Clare lost twelve Munster Under-21 Hurling finals before finally making the breakthrough in 2009. In the opening round Clare defeated Limerick in Cusack Park, Ennis to qualify for the final. In the final, they prevailed over Waterford on a scoreline of 2-17 to 2-12 in Dungarvan. Clare faced a highly fancied Galway side in the semi-final. The match could not be decided over the sixty minutes so extra-time was required. Eventually the Banner County prevailed on a scoreline of 3-23 to 5-15. In September 2009, Clare won their first ever All-Ireland under-21 hurling title with a 0-15 to 0-14 win over Kilkenny at Croke Park, Dublin. The match was a tight affair and was only decided after a late Cormac O'Donovan point. A second half contribution of three points from play from John Conlon was pivotal in helping Clare to victory. Darach Honan received the Bord Gáis Breakthrough award for 2009.

All-Ireland Treble (2012, 2013 & 2014)
In 2012, Clare easily accounted for Waterford in the Munster semi-final to qualify for the final against Tipperary. Going into injury time in the final, the Banner County trailed by a single point, but a late goal from second-half substitute, Niall Arthur, helped Clare win out by 1-16 to 1-14. Clare then beat Antrim in the All-Ireland semi-final. In the final Clare outplayed Kilkenny and won on a scoreline of 2-17 to 2-11. Clare retained their Munster and All-Ireland titles the following year. In the opening round of their 2013 campaign, Clare shook of a determined Waterford side to win 2-15 to 0-17. Clare once more faced Tipperary in the Munster final, this time in Semple Stadium, Thurles. Clare emerged victorious once more, winning 1-17 to 2-10. In the All-Ireland semi-final, Clare easily accounted for Galway, defeating the tribesman by 1-16 to 0-07. They went on to successfully defend their All-Ireland title by defeating Antrim by 2-28 to 0-12. In 2014, Clare defeated Limerick by 2-20 to 1-14 to reach the Munster semi-final where, after extra-time, they defeated Tipperary by 5-19 to 1-25. In what was their sixth final in seven years, Clare easily accounted for Cork, winning by 1-28 to 1-13. This was the first time any Clare team had won three consecutive provincial titles. Clare qualified for their third successive All-Ireland Under-21 final after beating Antrim on a scoreline of 4-28 to 1-10. Clare completed the All-Ireland treble when they defeated Wexford by 2-20 to 3-11 in Semple Stadium, Thurles.

Competitive record
All-Ireland Under-21 Hurling Championship Final appearances

Minor team
Clare have won 4 Munster Championships and 1 All-Ireland in the minor grade.

Arrival On The Scene (1981 & 1989)
Clare won the Munster Minor title for the first time in 1981, defeating Tipperary by two points, 3-13 to 3-11. Clare didn't qualify for the final again until 1989. This time Limerick were the opposition and Clare prevailed once more, winning by a single point, 2-13 to 2-12. Clare went on to qualify for the All-Ireland final but were defeated by Offaly by 2-16 to 1-12.

All-Ireland Success (1997)
Clare's only All-Ireland title in the minor grade arrived in 1997 when the county's minors completed a double with the seniors, who defeated Tipperary on the same day. The minor team went through the backdoor after losing the Munster final to Tipperary by 2-13 to 1-13. Clare qualified for the final by beating Antrim by 0-13 to 1-04 and then defeating Kilkenny in the semi-final on a scoreline of 0-13 to 1-07. In the final Clare emerged victorious defeating Galway by 1-11 to 1-09.

Back-to-Back Munster Minor Titles (2010 & 2011)
In 2010, Clare were beaten by Waterford in the opening round of the Munster Championship, but they would make their way to the competition's semi-final after beating Kerry and Tipperary, by 0-17 to 1-13, in the play-offs. In the semi-final, Clare edged out Limerick on a scoreline of 1-17 to 2-12. In the final, Clare exacted revenge on Waterford for their opening round defeat and won by 1-16 to 1-11. Clare beat Dublin in the All-Ireland semi-final by 0-20 to 2-13. In the final, Clare lost to Kilkenny 2-10 to 0-14. Clare then proceeded to retain their Munster crown in 2011. Clare easily accounted for Kerry in the opening round and in the semi-final, defeated Tipperary on a by 3-13 to 1-13. Clare won the final, by beating Waterford by 1-20 to 3-09 and were the first Clare team to retain their provincial crown. In the All-Ireland semi-final, Galway defeated Clare, 1-23 to 1-18, after extra-time. Clare missed out on a three in a row when they lost the 2012 final to Tipperary, 1-16 to 1-12.

Competitive record
All-Ireland Minor Hurling Championship Final appearances

References

 
County hurling teams